Wang Chen (born 2 December 1950) is a Chinese journalist and politician who served as the first-ranked Vice Chairperson of the Standing Committee of the 13th National People's Congress. He was a member of the 19th Politburo of the Chinese Communist Party. He served as Director of State Council Information Office from 2008 to 2013 and as the Secretary-General of the 12th National People's Congress Standing Committee from 2013 to 2018.

Career 
Wang was born in Beijing in 1950. He served in Guangming Daily Agency for many years, and became the editor in chief of that newspaper in 1995. In June 2000 he was appointed as deputy director of Propaganda Department of the Chinese Communist Party (CCP). In August 2001, he became the Editor in Chief of People's Daily. In October of same year, he became vice chairman of China National Journalist Association. He was promoted to president of People's Daily Agency. In March 2003, he became the chairman of Chinese Newspapers Association. From 2008 to 2013, he served as Director of the Information Office of the State Council. He was appointed Director of the newly created State Internet Information Office under the Information Office in May 2011.

He is a member of the 19th CCP Politburo. He was also a member of the 16th, 17th and 18th CCP Central Committees, and a member of the 9th National Committee of the Chinese People's Political Consultative Conference (CPPCC).

U.S. sanctions 
On December 7, 2020, the U.S. Department of the Treasury imposed sanctions on the entire body of 14 Vice Chairpersons of the National People's Congress of China, including Wang Chen, for "undermining Hong Kong's autonomy and restricting the freedom of expression or assembly."

Despite these sanctions, the American Chamber of Commerce in China hosted Wang at its annual appreciation dinner on December 10, 2020, which stirred controversy and criticism in the U.S.

References 

1950 births
Living people
Chairperson and vice chairpersons of the Standing Committee of the 12th National People's Congress
Chairperson and vice chairpersons of the Standing Committee of the 13th National People's Congress
Chinese Communist Party politicians from Beijing
Chinese individuals subject to U.S. Department of the Treasury sanctions
Guangming Daily people
Individuals sanctioned by the United States under the Hong Kong Autonomy Act
Members of the 16th Central Committee of the Chinese Communist Party
Members of the 17th Central Committee of the Chinese Communist Party
Members of the 18th Central Committee of the Chinese Communist Party
Members of the 19th Politburo of the Chinese Communist Party
Members of the 9th Chinese People's Political Consultative Conference
People's Daily people
People's Republic of China journalists
People's Republic of China politicians from Beijing